Hedwig Grossman Lehmann (1902–1995) was a German-born Israeli artist.

Biography

Hedwig Grossman was born in Germany in 1902. Her father was Polish and her mother, Hispanic. Hedwig's family grew up as assimilated and anti-Zionistic Jews. During her childhood, Hedwig joined a German youth movement "Vender Fogal". She left this group to later join the Zionistic Jewish youth movement "Blue and White":he:בלאו וייס.

Grossman showed an early talent for art and attended art classes in her school where they taught pottery. Grossman's success was written up in the local newspaper where she was noted as being the first woman in this field. Later Grossman moved to a small potter's village in Lower Silesia and further developed her pottery skills. After that she moved to Bolesławiec where she studied the Chemistry of Pottery and experimented with clay from Israel, as she was interested in moving to Israel.
Grossman moved to Berlin in 1930 and opened a pottery workshop. She participated in exhibitions and was accepted into the "Creative Women Union".

In the years 1930–1933 she began working with Rudi Lehmann , whom she later married. In the autumn of 1932 she immigrated to the Land of Israel with her husband, settling in Haifa. Grossman was one of the first Israeli artists to use local clays and derived inspiration from Arab pottery. Grossman's ceramic works made use of local Israeli materials and natural colors and shows influences from archaeological artifacts. In the early 1950s, she began to produce woodcuts. In 1935, Grossman established a flower pot factory and ceramic workshop at Kibbutz Yagur. In 1937, the couple moved to Jerusalem. In 1953, she was one of the founders of the Artists' Colony Ein Hod, where she lived until 1957. In 1959, the couple moved to Givatayim, where they established a municipal art school.

Hedwig Grossman Lehmann died in 1995.

Awards and recognition
 Silver Medal, The Triennale of Applied Arts, Milan
 1955 second place in Ceramics industry, Haifa Museum of Art, Haifa                             
 1973 Ben-Yitzhak Prize for Children's Books Illustration, Israel Museum, Jerusalem. Grossman's book "Terra Cotta" won a special mention.

Education
 Hebrow, Hochschule für die Wissenschaft des Judentums, Berlin, Germany
 1923-1920 Pestalozzi Freiwillhaus, Berlin, Germany
 Deutsche Hochschule für Politik, Berlin, Germany
 Sculpture, ceramics, graphic art, School of Art and Design Berlin, Berlin, Germany
 Ceramic engineering and laboratory, Technion, Berlin, Germany
 Professional School of Ceramics, Bolesławiec, Germany 1927–1928
 1928–1929 School of Art and Design, Halle, Germany

Teaching
 1919–1923 Counselor at an orphanage for Polish war orphans and Jüdisches Volksheim youth 
 Center in Berlin 1930–1933 Teacher, private studio, Berlin 1937–1957 Teacher, private studio, *Jerusalem 1956–1959 Teacher, private studio, Ein Hod 1964-1980s Art Institute of Givatayim.

References

External links
 
 
 

1902 births
1998 deaths
Artists from Berlin
Jewish emigrants from Nazi Germany to Mandatory Palestine
Israeli artists